Donald John Bacon (born August 16, 1963) is an American politician and former military officer serving as the U.S. representative for Nebraska's 2nd congressional district since 2017. Before holding public office, he was a United States Air Force officer, rising to brigadier general and wing commander at Ramstein Air Base and Offutt Air Force Base before his retirement in 2014. Bacon is a moderate centrist member of the Republican Party.

Early life, education, and military career
Bacon is originally from Momence, Illinois, the son of Donald and Joan Bacon of Bourbonnais. He grew up on a family farm in Momence and graduated from Grace Baptist Academy in Kankakee in 1980.

Bacon attended Northern Illinois University and gained a commission through the Air Force ROTC program, interning in Representative Edward Rell Madigan's Washington D.C. office during his senior year. In his military career he specialized in electronic warfare, intelligence, reconnaissance and public affairs, and qualified as a Master Navigator. He served as a Wing Commander at Ramstein Air Base in Germany and at Offutt Air Force Base in Nebraska, as a Group commander and Squadron Commander at Davis–Monthan Air Force Base in Arizona and an Expeditionary Squadron commander in Iraq. Bacon has earned master's degrees from the National War College of the National Defense University and the University of Phoenix. His final assignment was as Director of ISR Strategy, Plans, Doctrine and Force Development, AF/A2, Headquarters U.S. Air Force at the Pentagon from July 2012.In 2014, Bacon retired from the U.S. Air Force. During his 29 years in the Air Force, he was awarded the Air Force Distinguished Service Medal, two Legion of Merits and two Bronze Star Medals; he was selected as Europe's top Air Force Wing Commander in 2009. He served as an aide to U.S. Representative Jeff Fortenberry and assistant professor at Bellevue University before running for office.

U.S. House of Representatives

Elections
2016

The general election race was considered a tossup, with Democratic incumbent Brad Ashford seen as having a slight edge. After a 2005 videotape showing Donald Trump making lewd remarks to Billy Bush surfaced in October 2016, Bacon said that Trump could not win the presidency and should withdraw from the race in favor of "a strong conservative candidate, like Mike Pence." But Bacon did not say that he would not vote for Donald Trump, since he did not "believe Hillary is the right person. I'm in a quandary."

Bacon narrowly defeated Ashford in the general election on November 8, 2016, with 48.9% of the vote to Ashford's 47.7%. He was the only Republican to defeat an incumbent Democrat in the 2016 House elections.

2018

Bacon was reelected in 2018, narrowly defeating progressive Democrat Kara Eastman with 51.0% of the vote to her 49.0%.

2020

Bacon and Eastman faced off again in the 2020 general election. Bacon was reelected by a larger margin than in 2018, winning 51.0% of the vote to Eastman's 46.2%, even as Democratic presidential nominee Joe Biden won the district by 6.5 points. He was endorsed by his predecessor, Democrat Brad Ashford, whom he defeated in 2016.

Tenure
After his election, Bacon was sworn in to the 115th Congress in January 2017. During his first term he served on the House Agriculture Committee, Homeland Security Committee and the Armed Services Committee. During Donald Trump's presidency, Bacon voted in line with Trump's position 89.4% of the time. The Lugar Center ranked Bacon 89th out of 435 House members in bipartisanship.

Bacon was reelected in 2018 and served in the 116th Congress, continuing to serve on the Agriculture and Armed Services committees. His bipartisanship ranking rose to 15th out of 435.

In 2021, Bacon was seated for his third term.

During the first year of Joe Biden's presidency, Bacon voted in line with Biden's position 29.5% of the time.

Following the 2022 midterm elections and announcements by members of the Freedom Caucus that they would oppose or demand concessions of presumptive House Speaker Kevin McCarthy, Bacon announced he was willing to work with Democrats to elect a moderate Republican, saying, "we need to govern. We can't sit neutral; we can't have total gridlock for two years".

Committee assignments
 Committee on Agriculture 
 Subcommittee on Livestock and Foreign Agriculture
 Subcommittee on Nutrition, Oversight, and Department Operations
 Committee on Armed Services
 Subcommittee on Intelligence and Special Operations
 Subcommittee on Tactical Air and Land Forces

Caucus memberships

 Autism Caucus
Baltic Caucus, co-chair 
Career and Technical Education Caucus 
Caucus on Hellenic Issues 
Caucus on U.S.-Turkey Relations 
Civility and Respect Caucus 

Climate Solutions Caucus 
Congressional Caucus on Foster Youth, co-chair 
For Country Caucus, former co-chair
GPS Caucus, founder 
Law Enforcement Caucus
Motorcycle Caucus

Postal Preservation Caucus 
Problem Solvers Caucus
Republican Study Committee
 Soccer Caucus, co-chair
 Uzbekistan Caucus
 Western Caucus

Political positions

Armed services and foreign policy 

Bacon has been a member of the Armed Services Committee since taking office in 2017.

Bacon supported airstrikes in Syria in retaliation for the Assad government's use of chemical weapons. In 2019, Bacon voted for a resolution opposing Trump's move to withdraw U.S. support for the Kurds in Syria, which exposed Kurdish militias to attacks from Turkey.

At a Brookings Institution event in October 2017, Bacon stressed the importance of military readiness and called for U.S. Air Force crews to increase flight hours to enhance readiness. He also said the "gravest threat" to military readiness was the "partisan divide" in government, which had prevented necessary increases in spending.

Bacon supports a stronger U.S. presence in the Balkans to counter Russia, which he has called a key adversary of the United States. He has expressed alarm regarding Russia's activity in Ukraine and the Balkans, as well as Russian interference in the 2016 United States elections and attempted Russian interference in other nations' elections. Bacon does not consider China a U.S. adversary, but has criticized it for its regional power ambitions and its trade with North Korea, and supports strong U.S. alliances with Japan and Taiwan to counter China.

In November 2017, Bacon told an electronic warfare (EW) conference that the U.S. military needed "to elevate the electromagnetic spectrum to an official domain of warfare—alongside land, sea, air, space, and cyberspace–and appoint general officers as EW advocates in all four services and to the joint staff." He said the U.S. should reintensify its EW capabilities, which he said had atrophied after the collapse of the Soviet Union.Bacon supports an "ironclad partnership" with Israel and endorsed the recognition of Jerusalem as the capital of Israel.

Bacon is a consistent supporter of Taiwan. In 2019, he spent time with Representative Salud Carbajal and former Speaker Paul Ryan in Taiwan to commemorate the 40th anniversary of the Taiwan Relations Act and open a new de facto Embassy. Bacon said, "we owe it to be clear that Taiwan is a success story and we have to support their democracy."

In April 2022, the Russian Federation sanctioned and banned Bacon in retaliation for U.S. participation in sanctions against pro-war members of the Russian Duma during the 2022 Russian invasion of Ukraine.
In February 2023, Bacon signed a letter advocating for President Biden to give F-16 fighter jets to Ukraine.

Agriculture 

Bacon has been a member of the House Agriculture Committee since 2017. In 2019, he urged the United States Army Corps of Engineers to streamline its response to the 2019 Midwestern U.S. floods and pushed to fund levies to shore up flooded farmland and Offutt Air Force Base.

Bacon supported the 2018 Republican-led omnibus Farm Bill.

Abortion 
Bacon is firmly against abortion. He is a co-sponsor of the Life at Conception Act, which would guarantee "equal protection for the right to life of each born and preborn human person" under the 14th Amendment.

In 2017, he voted for legislation to ban abortion after 20 weeks of pregnancy and to repeal a rule requiring state and local governments to distribute federal funds to Federally Qualified Health Centers even if they perform abortions, a measure aimed at defunding Planned Parenthood. Bacon said he supported redirecting funds to community health care centers that do not provide abortion services.

Civil rights 
In 2019, Bacon and Representative Seth Moulton introduced The Justice for Victims of Lynching Act of 2019. The bill specified lynching as a unique deprivation of civil rights, and would for the first time make it a federal crime. The bill's language was incorporated into the 2020 Emmett Till Antilynching Act, which passed the House but was blocked by Rand Paul in the Senate. A later version became law in 2022.

Bacon expressed support for "most of" the George Floyd Justice in Policing Act of 2020. He supported mandatory wearing of body cameras by police officers while on duty and a national registry for police misconduct, but opposed ending qualified immunity provisions for officers. He also criticized provisions ending the Department of Defense 1033 program, which allows the transfer of surplus military equipment to law enforcement agencies, saying, "if our police are encountering a serious threat, I don't want an equal fight for them." He ultimately voted against the legislation in a mostly party-line vote.

The Naming Commission 

After the murder of George Floyd, Bacon and Anthony Brown introduced legislation to rename Department of Defense articles that valorized Southern confederate leaders or values. Alongside companion legislation introduced in the Senate by Elizabeth Warren, the bill resulted in the creation of The Naming Commission through incorporation into the omnibus National Defense Authorization Act. When asked about the bill, President Trump insisted that he would "not even consider" the proposal, to which Bacon replied in The New York Times, "you're wrong—you need to change... we're not the party of Jim Crow." Trump vetoed the NDAA for reasons he said included funding for the commission, after which Congress delivered the only veto override of his presidency.

LGBT rights

On July 19, 2022, Bacon and 46 other Republican representatives voted for the Respect for Marriage Act, which would codify the right to same-sex marriage in federal law. He said he does not believe "the government should dictate who can marry each other based on gender, race, or ethnicity."

Drug policy 
In 2018, Bacon said that he opposed marijuana legalization as a personal matter, but that he supported decriminalization at the federal level and believed that states should be permitted to make the decision. Bacon supported the 2018 Farm Bill, which legalized industrial hemp production.

Economic issues 
In 2017, Bacon voted for the Tax Cuts and Jobs Act of 2017. Bacon has expressed support for raising the full retirement age for eligibility for Social Security for Americans now under age 40.

Environment 
Bacon has said, "I don't think we know for certain how much of climate change is being caused by normal cyclical changes in weather vs. human causes. I support legislation that allows for continued incremental improvement in our environment, but oppose extreme measures that create significant economic and job disruption." He is a member of the bipartisan Climate Solutions Caucus.

Gun policy 

In 2018, Bacon said he would support a ban on bump stocks. In 2021, he introduced legislation to enhance penalties for engaging in illicit straw purchases of firearms.

Health care 
Bacon favors repealing the Affordable Care Act (ACA), commonly known as Obamacare, and opposes proposals for Medicare for All or single-payer healthcare. In May 2017, he voted for the American Health Care Act of 2017, Republican health-care legislation that would have repealed large portions of the ACA.

Immigration 

In August 2017, Bacon and five of his House colleagues urged Trump to preserve the Deferred Action for Childhood Arrivals program for undocumented youth brought to the United States as children (also known as "Dreamers"), "until we can pass a permanent legislative solution." In 2019, he voted for legislation to create a pathway to citizenship for undocumented youth.

Bacon has expressed support for construction of the U.S.-Mexico border wall supported by Trump. Bacon voted against legislation to end the December 2018–January 2019 government shutdown by appropriating funds without money for a border wall. He said that Trump's attempt to circumvent Congress by declaring a national emergency to redirect money from military construction to building a border wall was not "the right way to go" because it infringed on congressional powers, but voted against a House resolution to overturn the emergency declaration and against overriding Trump's veto of legislation that would have overturned the declaration.

In 2017, Bacon reintroduced the Kerrie Orozco Act, which would "allow the spouses of first responders, killed in the line of duty, access to a quicker process of becoming an American citizen."

Impeachment 
In 2019, the House voted on two articles of impeachment against President Donald Trump. Bacon voted against both articles.

In 2021, the House voted on one article of impeachment against Trump for incitement of insurrection after the January 6 attack on the U.S. Capitol. Bacon voted against the article.

Infrastructure 
Bacon initially said he would support President Biden's Infrastructure Investment and Jobs Act, and criticized Republicans for opposing it, but during negotiations he said he could not commit to voting for the bill. Ultimately, Bacon was one of 13 House Republicans to break with their party and vote with a majority of Democrats in favor of the legislation.

2020 presidential election 
In a December 2020 Washington Post survey of the 249 Republican members of Congress, Bacon was one of 37 who acknowledged Joe Biden as the legitimate President-elect.

Bacon did not join congressional Republicans who sided with the Trump campaign's attempts to overturn the 2020 United States presidential election. He voted to certify both Arizona's and Pennsylvania's votes in the 2021 United States Electoral College vote count.

On May 19, 2021, Bacon was one of 35 Republicans who joined Democrats in voting to approve legislation to establish the January 6 commission meant to investigate the storming of the U.S. Capitol. Before the vote, he was one of only a few Republican lawmakers who openly expressed their support for the commission.

Postal Service 
Bacon was one of 26 Republicans to vote with the Democratic caucus for a $25 billion relief bill for the U.S. Postal Service at the height of the COVID-19 pandemic.

Electoral history

Personal life
Bacon and his wife Angie (née Hardison) have four children and six grandchildren. They live in Papillion, Nebraska.

References

External links

Congressman Don Bacon official U.S. House website
Don Bacon for Congress

 

|-

1963 births
21st-century American politicians
Living people
Military personnel from Illinois
Military personnel from Nebraska
National War College alumni
Northern Illinois University alumni
People from Momence, Illinois
People from Papillion, Nebraska
Republican Party members of the United States House of Representatives from Nebraska
United States Air Force generals
University of Phoenix alumni